Niel Hans (born 24 April 1988) is an international footballer for Papua New Guinea. He played in the 2012 OFC Nations Cup.

International career

International goals
Scores and results list Papua New Guinea's goal tally first.

References

1988 births
Living people
Papua New Guinean footballers
Papua New Guinea international footballers
Place of birth missing (living people)
2012 OFC Nations Cup players
Association football forwards